Solute carrier family 2, facilitated glucose transporter member 11 (SLC2A11) also known as glucose transporter type 10/11 (GLUT-10/11) is a protein that in humans is encoded by the SLC2A11 gene.

SLC2A11 belongs to a family of plasma membrane proteins that mediate transport of sugars across the membrane by facilitative diffusion.

References

Further reading 
 
 
 
 
 

Solute carrier family